Tregele is a small, village located Mechell Community, in north Anglesey, Wales. Located about a mile south-west of the larger coastal village of Cemaes, it is also close to the Wylfa Nuclear Power Station now decommissioning on Wylfa Head. Despite its small size Tregele has a well stocked store and off licence incorporating a post office and petrol station  A shortwalk away is the quaint and sleepy town of Cemaes Bay with its sandy beaches and very pleasant harbour. The area is ideal for walkers and bird spotters as well as those who need to relax and unwind on the coastal path while taking in breathtaking scenery and wildlife. One kilometre south of the village is a cromlech (ancient burial chamber) named Llanfechell Cromlech.

References

Villages in Anglesey
Prehistoric sites in Anglesey
Mechell, Anglesey